Lieutenant Colonel Joseph Norris Peart  (12 February 1900 – 4 September 1942) was a New Zealand army officer and the fourth headmaster of King's College. He served in the army during World War II and was killed at El Alamein during the Battle of Alam el Halfa at the age of 42.

Early life

Peart was born in Collingwood to Alfred and Salina Peart. He was an alumnus of Auckland Grammar School, and a graduate of Cambridge University. After graduation, Peart pursued a career in education.

Headmastership

In 1937, Peart was appointed as the fourth headmaster of King's College, an independent secondary school in Middlemore. During his tenure as headmaster, Peart was remembered by his students as being youthful and as being a disciplinarian.

Military service

Shortly after the outbreak of World War II in 1939, Peart enlisted in the New Zealand Army and was granted a commission as a Major.  His first posting was as the Deputy Assistant Adjutant General in Greece and Crete. From November 1941 to March 1942, Peart was the Commanding Officer (CO) of the 18th Battalion. Later, from 1 May 1942, he was the CO of the 26th Battalion. Peart was awarded the Distinguished Service Order; the award was gazetted on 24 September 1942, i.e. three weeks after his death. The citation for this award reads as thus:
"For outstanding leadership, bravery and determination. At El Mreir Depression on the night 21/22 July, 1942 Lieutenant Colonel Peart led his Battalion in the 6 (NZ) Infantry Brigade attack on El Mreir Depression ... During all the fighting Lieutenant Colonel Peart was constantly moving about among his men encouraging them and at all times setting a high example of courage and perseverance. It is due to his outstanding leadership, determination and sound judgement that the Battalion remains a fighting unit."

Peart was killed on 4 September 1942 at El Alamein during the Battle of Alam el Halfa and he is buried at the El Alamein War Cemetery in Egypt.

Legacy
 Joseph Peart is the eponym of Peart House, King's College.

See also
Western Desert campaign

References

Alumni of Emmanuel College, Cambridge
1900 births
1942 deaths
People from Collingwood, New Zealand
New Zealand military personnel killed in World War II
New Zealand Army officers
People educated at Auckland Grammar School
New Zealand Companions of the Distinguished Service Order